The men's doubles tournament of the 2019 BWF World Championships (World Badminton Championships) takes place from 19 to 25 August.

Seeds 

The seeding list is based on the World Rankings from 30 July 2019.

  Marcus Fernaldi Gideon / Kevin Sanjaya Sukamuljo (second round)
  Li Junhui / Liu Yuchen (semifinals)
  Takeshi Kamura / Keigo Sonoda (quarterfinals)
  Mohammad Ahsan / Hendra Setiawan (champions)
  Hiroyuki Endo / Yuta Watanabe (second round)
  Han Chengkai / Zhou Haodong (third round)
  Fajar Alfian / Muhammad Rian Ardianto (semifinals)
  Kim Astrup / Anders Skaarup Rasmussen (third round)

  Aaron Chia / Soh Wooi Yik (second round)
  He Jiting / Tan Qiang  (third round)
  Lee Yang / Wang Chi-lin (third round)
  Takuro Hoki / Yugo Kobayashi (final)
  Liao Min-chun / Su Ching-heng (quarterfinals)
  Goh V Shem / Tan Wee Kiong  (third round)
  Satwiksairaj Rankireddy / Chirag Shetty (withdrew)
  Liu Cheng / Zhang Nan (quarterfinals)

Draw

Finals

Top half

Section 1

Section 2

Bottom half

Section 3

Section 4

References

2019 BWF World Championships